Cnemolia obliquevittata is a species of beetle in the family Cerambycidae. It was described by Breuning in 1978. The body is black with fine whitish-grey hairs.

References

Ancylonotini
Beetles described in 1978